Rufus Lamson House is a historic house in Cambridge, Massachusetts, listed on the National Register of Historic Places in 1982, a few blocks from the Lamson Place.

The house was apparently built and owned by Rufus Lamson (October 2, 1809 – July 13, 1879) and then inherited by his widow Mary Jane Lamson (Butler) (1812 – 1885) whom he married at Boston, on Thanksgiving Eve, 1832. Rufus Lamson was a stonemason and a large holder of real estate, known for his liberal treatment of the landlord and tenant relation. He was a member of the Universalist Church in Cambridge and served as an assessor for the city for twenty-two years.

Rufus Lamson and his son, Rufus William Lamson (1833–1912) ran a firm Rufus Lamson & Son that built many of the substantial brick structures now standing in Cambridgeport.

Asa Caleb Lamson (1848 - 1924), the youngest son of Rufus Lamson, has completed in 1908 a 5-story mansion located at 351 Massachusetts Avenue in Cambridge, MA, called The Lamson, presently occupied by Lambda Phi chapter of Alpha Delta Phi of MIT.

See also
 Rufus LAMSON (677) (1809 - 1879) Genealogy

References

Houses completed in 1854
Houses on the National Register of Historic Places in Cambridge, Massachusetts